The 1973–74 Albanian National Championship was the 35th official season, or 38th season of top-tier football in Albania (including three unofficial championships during World War II). Dinamo Tirana were the defending champions. The season began on 16 September 1973 and concluded on 9 June 1974.

Vllaznia were crowned Albanian champions for the fourth time in their history.

League table

Note: 'Labinoti' is Elbasani, 'Traktori' is Lushnja, "Lokomotiva Durrës' is Teuta, '17 Nëntori' is Tirana

Results

Relegation/promotion playoff

References

External links
Albania - List of final tables (RSSSF)

Kategoria Superiore seasons
1
Albania